The 1976–77 NBA season was Indiana's first season in the NBA and tenth season as a franchise.

Offseason

Draft picks

†In the 1976 ABA Dispersal Draft, ABA and NBA teams selected players that were on the Kentucky Colonels and the Spirits of St. Louis, the two ABA teams that were not included in the ABA–NBA merger in 1976. Wil Jones was a member of the Kentucky Colonels during the 1975–76 ABA season. Because the Pacers were in the ABA before the merger, they did not have any picks in the 1976 NBA draft.

Roster

Regular season

Buoyed by the sensational playmaking of Don Buse and scoring of Billy Knight, The Pacers hovered around the .500 mark for much of the first half of their inaugural NBA season but a lack of depth and a few injuries blunted the Pacers progress.  The Pacers were significantly hampered by injuries to center, Len Elmore, who missed all but six games.

Season standings

z – clinched division title
y – clinched division title
x – clinched playoff spot

Record vs. opponents

Awards and records
Billy Knight, NBA All-Star Game
Don Buse, NBA All-Star Game
Don Buse, NBA All-Defensive First Team

References

Indiana Pacers seasons
Indiana
Indiana Pacers
Indiana Pacers